The Chalfont Historic District is a national historic district located in a portion of the Borough of Chalfont, Bucks County, Pennsylvania.  The district encompasses Main Street (Pennsylvania Route 152) and Butler Avenue (U.S. Route 202 Business) with their American colonial and Victorian-style homes.   The district includes 121 contributing buildings and 1 contributing site in the borough of Chalfont. Historic buildings include the Simon Butler Mill House, built in 1730, and the Chalfont train station.

It was added to the National Register of Historic Places in 2006.

See also
 List of Registered Historic Places in Bucks County, Pennsylvania

References
 Chalfont Historic District

Historic districts in Bucks County, Pennsylvania
Historic districts on the National Register of Historic Places in Pennsylvania
National Register of Historic Places in Bucks County, Pennsylvania